The 2021 Chinese Super League, officially known as the 2021 Ping An Chinese Football Association Super League for sponsorship reasons, was the 18th season since the establishment of the Chinese Super League. The league title sponsor is Ping An Insurance.

Jiangsu were the defending champions before they ceased operation on 28 February 2021 and were disqualified by the Chinese Football Association on 29 March 2021.

Club changes
Clubs promoted from 2020 China League One
 Changchun Yatai

Dissolved entries
 Jiangsu (Jiangsu Suning)

Name changes

In December 2020, the CFA issued a policy to "neutralize" the names of all professional football clubs. Club names cannot contain any term of a sponsorship or commercial nature, and non-Chinese characters cannot be used. Most Chinese football clubs had to be renamed. There were some debates as to whether or not some long-existing club names, for example, "Shandong Taishan" and "Beijing Guoan", were acceptable. After Henan Jianye was renamed to "Luoyang Longmen", club fans protested in front of the club stadium. Some clubs, including the 2020 Chinese Super League winner Jiangsu F.C., China League One team Beijing Chengfeng and China League Two team Yancheng Luzhiying, dissolved subsequent to their renaming.

Rule changes 
The CFA imposed a salary cap on the Super League in December 2020, taking effect with the 2021 season. Each club's total player wages are capped at ¥600 million, with a separate limit of €10 million for foreign players. Individual player salaries are also capped, at ¥5 million before tax for Chinese players, and €3 million for foreign players.

Clubs

Stadiums and locations

Clubs locations

Managerial changes

Neutral grounds for 2021 Chinese Super League

Guangzhou stadia 
Tianhe Stadium
Yuexiushan Stadium
Guangzhou Higher Education Mega Center Central Stadium 
Huadu Stadium

Suzhou stadia 
Kunshan Stadium
Suzhou Olympic Sports Centre
Suzhou Olympic Sports Centre Outer Field
Suzhou Sports Center
Jiangyin Stadium

Foreign players
Players name in bold indicates the player is registered during the mid-season transfer window.

 For Hong Kong, Macau, or Taiwanese players, if they are non-naturalized and were registered as professional footballers in Hong Kong's, Macau's, or Chinese Taipei's football association for the first time, they are recognized as native players. Otherwise they are recognized as foreign players.
 Naturalized players whose parents or grandparents were born in Mainland China, thus are regarded as local players.

Regular season

Group A (Guangzhou stadia)

League table

Results

Positions by round

Results by match played

Group B (Suzhou stadia)

League table

Results

Positions by round

Results by match played

Championship stage

League table

Results

Positions by round

Results by match played

Relegation stage

League table

Results

Positions by round

Results by match played

Relegation play-offs

Overview

Matches

Chengdu Rongcheng won 2–1 on aggregate.

Zhejiang won 1–0 on aggregate.

Statistics

Top scorers

Top assists

Hat-tricks

Notes
(H) – Home team 
(A) – Away team

Awards

Players of the Round
The following players were named the Players of the Round.

League attendance

Notes

References

External links
Current CSL table, and recent results/fixtures at Soccerway

Chinese Super League seasons
1
China